Helgheim is a village in Sunnfjord Municipality in Vestland county, Norway. The village lies along the European route E39 highway. Helgheim Church, which serves the eastern part of the municipality, is located on the lake shore in Helgheim.

References

Villages in Vestland
Sunnfjord